Hugh Howard (27 January 1761 – 3 November 1840), styled The Honourable from 1776, was an Anglo-Irish politician.

Early life
Howard was born in 1761 as a younger son of Ralph Howard, 1st Viscount Wicklow and the former Alice Forward who was made suo jure Countess of Wicklow in 1793 after the death of his father. Among his siblings was Robert Howard, 2nd Earl of Wicklow, a Representative Peer for Ireland from 1800 to 1815 and William Howard, 3rd Earl of Wicklow.

Career
Howard was elected to the Irish House of Commons as the Member of Parliament for St Johnstown in 1790, and held the seat until its disenfranchisement  following the Acts of Union 1800.

Personal life
On 20 December 1792, Howard was married to Catharine Bligh, the second daughter of Very Rev. Robert Bligh, Dean of Elphin. Together, they were the parents of:

 Sir Ralph Howard, 1st Baronet (1801–1873), an MP who married Charlotte Anne Fraser, the widow of Lt.-Col. Sir James John Fraser, 3rd Baronet, and only child of Daniel Craufurd, in 1837.
 Robert Howard (d. 1833)
 Frances Howard (d. 1814), who married William Parnell Hayes of Avondale in 1810.
 Isabella Howard (d. 1836), who married Granville Proby, 3rd Earl of Carysfort, in 1818.
 Theodosia Howard (d. 1836), who married, as his second wife, Richard Wingfield, 5th Viscount Powerscourt, in 1822.

Howard died on 3 November 1840.

References

1761 births
1840 deaths
18th-century Anglo-Irish people
Hugh
Irish MPs 1790–1797
Irish MPs 1798–1800
Younger sons of viscounts
Members of the Parliament of Ireland (pre-1801) for County Donegal constituencies